Yakusoku (約束 / Promise) is the twenty-sixth single by the Japanese hip-hop group Lead, and was the final single before the release of their studio album The Showcase (2016). It performed well on Oricon at #5 and remained on the charts for two weeks.

The single was released as a standard CD and three limited edition versions, two of which were CD+DVD combos, each carrying different content. While all editions contained the b-side "Always Love", each of the limited editions harbored differing bonus tracks. The CD+DVD editions not only contained different content on the CD portions, but also carried different content on the DVD portions.

Information
Yakusoku is the twenty-sixth single released by the Japanese hip-hop group Lead. It was their final single before their seventh studio album, The Showcase, which was released the following year on June 8. It charted well on the Oricon Singles Charts at #5 for the week, and remained on the charts for two consecutive weeks.

The single was released in four editions, a standard CD, a limited edition CD and two limited edition CD+DVD combo packs. The regular edition contained the title track, the coupling track "Always Love" - which was available on all versions - and their corresponding instrumentals. The limited type A CD+DVD version harbored the two tracks, the bonus track "Wake me up" and the accompanying instrumentals. The DVD portion housed the music video for "Yakusoku" and the off-shot making video. The limited type B CD+DVD editions contained the two regular tracks and the bonus track "Moonlight Shower" (ムーンライトシャワー / MUUNRAITO SHAWAA), along with their instrumentals. The DVD portion contained the dance version of "Yakusoku" and the behind-the-scenes footage of the photo shoot for the different single covers. The limited Type C version contained the two standard tracks, the bonus track "Cross Over" (stylized as CROSS OVER) and the songs' corresponding instrumentals.

Track listing

Charts

References

External links
Lead Official Site

2015 singles
2015 songs
Japanese-language songs
Pony Canyon singles
Lead (band) songs